Zhang Wufeng (born October 1960) is a former Chinese politician who served as director of the National Food and Strategic Reserves Administration from 2018 to 2022. As of June 2022 he was under investigation by China's top anti-corruption agency. 

He was a delegate to the 12th National People's Congress. He was a representative of the 19th National Congress of the Chinese Communist Party. He was a member of the 19th CCP Central Commission for Discipline Inspection.

Biography
Zhang was born in Laiwu County (now Laiwu), Shandong, in October 1960. In February 1978, he entered Jining Business School, majoring in statistics. 

After graduating in December 1979, he was assigned to the Shandong Provincial Administration for Industry and Commerce, where he eventually became its deputy director in August 2000. He joined the Chinese Communist Party (CCP) in April 1984. In December 2006, he was transferred to Linyi and appointed executive vice mayor. In January 2011, he was named acting mayor, confirmed in the following month. He became director of Shandong Development and Reform Commission in February 2013, and served until July 2015, when he was chosen as vice governor of Shandong.

In February 2017, he was appointed director of the State Administration of Grain (soon was reshuffled as the National Food and Strategic Reserves Administration in March 2018), and was admitted to member of the CCP National Development and Reform Commission Committee, the commission's top authority.

Downfall
On 16 June 2022, he has been placed under investigation for "serious violations of laws and regulations" by the Central Commission for Discipline Inspection (CCDI), the party's internal disciplinary body, and the National Supervisory Commission, the highest anti-corruption agency of China.

On 30 December 2022, Wufeng was expelled from the CCP.

References

1960 births
Living people
People from Laiwu
Central Party School of the Chinese Communist Party alumni
People's Republic of China politicians from Shandong
Chinese Communist Party politicians from Shandong
Delegates to the 12th National People's Congress